This is a list of banks operating in Venezuela.

References 

Banks of Venezuela
Venezuela
Banks
Venezuela